Skylar Anne Johnston (born February 18, 1998) is an American softball player. She attended First Colonial High School in Virginia Beach, Virginia. She later attended Fordham University for two years, before transferring to North Carolina State University. At both universities, she played on the school's respective college softball teams. While playing at Fordham, Johnston led the Rams to back-to-back Atlantic 10 Conference championships and NCAA tournament appearances in 2017 and 2018.

References

External links
 
NC State bio
Fordham bio

1998 births
American softball players
Living people
Sportspeople from Virginia Beach, Virginia
Fordham Rams softball players
NC State Wolfpack softball players